The Convent of las Carmelitas de San José (Spanish: Convento de las Carmelitas de San José) is a Carmelite convent located in Guadalajara, Spain. It was declared Bien de Interés Cultural in 1992.

References

External links 

Bien de Interés Cultural landmarks in the Province of Guadalajara
Buildings and structures in Guadalajara, Spain
Monasteries in Castile-la Mancha
Convents in Spain